The Galičnik dialect (Galički dijalekt) or Mala Reka dialect (Malorekanski dijalekt) is a member of the subgroup of western and north western dialects of the western group of dialects of Macedonian. The dialect is spoken on small territory on the mountain Bistra in western part of the Republic of Macedonia.  The name of the dialect is derived by the biggest village in that area- Galičnik. Also the dialect is spoken in many other small villages including the village Gari.  The Galičnik dialect is closely related with the Reka dialect which is spoken north-western of Galičnik dialect. This dialect is well known in Republic of Macedonia because of the archaic words that this dialect has. The dialect can be found in many historically important literary works for the Macedonian literature. One of the most important is Ǵorǵija Puleski and his dictionary of three languages.

Phonological characteristics
Proto-Slavic *ǫ > : *rǫka > рока  ('hand'), a shibboleth among Macedonian dialects;
Proto-Slavic syllabic *l̥ >  ~  ~ : *žl̥tъ > ж`лт  ~  ('yellow');
intervocalic Proto-Slavic *x > /j/: *čekaxa > чекаја  (3P pl.  of 'to wait');
merger of thematic е-group verbs to и-group verbs: јадет  → јадит  (3P sg.  of 'to eat');
earlier cluster -шт-  → -шч- : што  → шчо  (interr. pron. 'what');
/ʒ/ instead of /d͡ʒ/ in loanwords: Turkish cam  > жам  ('windowpane'), and
mostly antepenultimate word stress.

Morphological characteristics
use of the suffix -ет for 3P pl. : ставает  ('[they are] putting, placing'), јадет  ('[they are] eating']), одет  ('[they are] going');
use of the suffix -т for 3P sg. : стават  ('[he/she/it is] putting, placing'), јадит  ('[he/she/it is] eating'), одит  ('[he/she/it is] going');
use of the immutable particle ќа  with [conjugated] verbs to form future tenses: ќа одам  ('I will go'), and
use of the preposition в(о)  ('in, inside, to').

Examples of the dialect
Traditional song from Galičnik, that is sung on the holiday Vasilica:

Сурова, сурова година;
Весела, весела година;
Ж`лт мајмун на леса;
П`лна куќа коприна;
Живо-здраво, живо-здраво;
До година, до амина!

References

Dialects of the Macedonian language
Mavrovo and Rostuša Municipality